Ecotopia is an album by American world music/jazz group Oregon featuring Ralph Towner, Paul McCandless, Glen Moore, and Trilok Gurtu, who replaced Collin Walcott following his accidental death, recorded in 1987 and released on the ECM label.

Reception

The AllMusic review by Thom Jurek states, "there is no excuse for this waste of studio time and Manfred Eicher's energy. It is no wonder that he began the ECM New Series a few years before, given the junk churned out by some of label's stable between 1983 and 1988, and this record is a stellar example. Simply put, this is a trite, new age piece of dreck slopped out by a group of musicians whose combined creativity should always take them to stellar heights. There are no redeeming tracks on this disc, and few redeeming moments ".

Track listing
All compositions by Ralph Towner except as indicated
 "Twice Around the Sun" - 10:31 
 "Innocente" - 6:24 
 "WBAI" (Trilok Gurtu, Paul McCandless, Glen Moore, Ralph Towner) - 2:02 
 "Zephyr" - 5:55 
 "Ecotopia" - 5:06 
 "Leather Cats" (Glen Moore, Samantha Moore) - 7:39 
 "ReDial" - 5:59 
 "Song of the Morrow" (Collin Walcott) - 5:16
Recorded at Tonstudio Bauer in Ludwigsburg, West Germany in March 1987

Personnel
Paul McCandless - soprano saxophone, oboe, English horn; wind driven synthesizers on "WBAI"
Glen Moore - bass
Ralph Towner - classical guitar, 12 string guitar, piano, Prophet-10 synthesizer; drum machine on "Twice Around the Sun"
Trilok Gurtu - tabla, percussion

References

ECM Records albums
Oregon (band) albums
1987 albums
Albums produced by Manfred Eicher